Ingrid C. "Indy" Burke is the Carl W. Knobloch, Jr. Dean at the Yale School of Forestry & Environmental Studies. She is the first female dean in the school's 116 year history. Her area of research is ecosystem ecology with a primary focus on carbon cycling and nitrogen cycling in semi-arid rangeland ecosystems. She teaches on subjects relating to ecosystem ecology, and biogeochemistry.

Early life and education 
Burke received her B.S in biology from Middlebury College and her Ph.D in botany from the University of Wyoming. At Middlebury College, Burke was planning on becoming an English major, but after taking a science class where they examined the role of photosynthesis in aquatic environments she became fascinated by the topic of environmental science. Soon after taking this class, Burke decided to switch her major to biology after realizing that she could spend her life working outside and be able to solve scientific mysteries as a profession. After her time at Middlebury College she started a Ph.D. track at Dartmouth College. Here she planned on studying a phenomenon known as “fir waves,” where rows of balsam fir trees die collectively, forming arresting patterns across the landscape, but after her advisor moved to work at the University of Wyoming, Burke decided to move as well. After finishing her Ph.D, she moved to Colorado State University where she started her professional career.

Career and research 
Burke's career as an environmental scientist began with a job teaching at Colorado State University in 1987 in the Natural Resource Ecology Laboratory. She became an associate professor in the Department of Forest Sciences at Colorado State University in 1994. In 2008 she began teaching at the University of Wyoming where she earned a spot as the director of the Haub School of Environment and Natural Resources. She worked there until 2016 when she became the Carl W. Knobloch, Jr. Dean at the Yale School of Forestry & Environmental Studies.

Burke is also on the board of directors at The Conservation Fund.

Burke has published over 150 peer reviewed articles, chapter, books and reports including the investigation of a significant project titled, "A Regional Assessment of Land Use Effects on Ecosystem Structure and Function in the Central Grasslands" from 1996-1999. This project had major implications for understanding and managing ecosystems in the central United States.

Selected publications 

 The Importance of Land-Use Legacies to Ecology and Conservation (2003) BioScience, Vol 53, Issue 1, 77–88
 Texture, Climate, and Cultivation Effects on Soil Organic Matter Content in U.S. Grassland Soils (1989) Soil Science Society of America Journal, Vol. 53 No. 3, 800-805 
 Global-Scale Similarities in Nitrogen Release Patterns During Long-Term Decomposition (2007) Science,  Vol. 315, Issue 5810, 361-364
 ANPP Estimates From NDVI for the Central Grasslands Region of The United States (1997) Ecology, Vol. 78, No 3, 953-958
Interactions Between Individual Plant Species and Soil Nutrient Status in Shortgrass Steppe (1995) Ecology, Vol. 76, No 4, 45-52

additional publications can be found on her Google Scholar profile.

Notable awards and honors 
Her awards and honors include:

 2019 Fellow, Ecological Society of America,  for advancing our understanding of ecosystem processes, in particular nitrogen and carbon cycling in grasslands.
 2018 Fellow, Connecticut Academy of Science and Engineering
 2012 Promoting Intellectual Engagement Award, University of Wyoming
 2010 Fellow, American Association for the Advancement of Sciences
 2008 USDA Agricultural Research Service, Rangeland Resources Unit: Award for Enhancing Collaborative Research Partnerships
 2005 Colorado State University Honors Professor
 2004–2005 National Academy of Sciences Education Fellow in the Life Science
 2001-2008 University Distinguished Teaching Scholar, Colorado State University
 2000 Mortar Board Rose Award, Colorado State University
 1993–‘98 National Science Foundation Presidential Faculty Fellow Award

References 

Living people
Year of birth missing (living people)
Middlebury College alumni
University of Wyoming alumni
Yale University faculty
Colorado State University faculty
University of Wyoming faculty
American botanists
Biogeochemists
Fellows of the American Association for the Advancement of Science